The 2017–18 Air Force Falcons men's ice hockey season was the 50th season of play for the program and the 12th season in the Atlantic Hockey conference. The Falcons represented the United States Air Force Academy and were coached by Frank Serratore, in his 21st season.

Season
After a program-best season, Air Force entered the season with a preseason ranking, a rarity for an Atlantic Hockey school. Early on it appeared that the Falcons were going to live up to the expectations when new starting goaltender, Billy Christopoulos, filled in ably for the departed Shane Starett. However, after beginning 5–1–1, the team's offense faltered and the Falcons went through a rough patch in November and December. The defense kept Air Force in most of their games, but the Falcons were finding it difficult to score. By the end of the year, the team found itself under .500 and wallowing near the bottom of the conference standings.

Christopoulos raised his game in the second half of the season, keeping the opposition to 2 goals or fewer on most nights. The offense, too, redoubled its efforts and the Falcons began to score once more. Slowly, the team climbed out of the cellar and moved up the standings. By the end of February, Air Force had miraculously pulled into a 3-way tie for 3rd place in the conference and entered the Atlantic Hockey Tournament with a bye into the quarterfinal round.

Conference tournament
As their postseason began, Air Force's only chance at making the NCAA Tournament was to win their conference. To do that, they would first have to overcome Army on the road. After winning the first game 5–3, the Falcons got into a defensive struggle with the Black Knights. Despite firing 33 shots on goal, Army netminder Cole Bruns turned everything aside and tied the series with a 1–0 victory. The Falcons increased the pressure in the deciding 3rd game, but again Bruns wouldn't let anything get past him. Fortunately, Christopoulos was equal to the task and the teams entered overtime with a clean scoresheet. Air Force continued the barrage, firing five shots on goal in less than 7 minutes with the last finally registering. Senior alternate captain Tyler Ledford won the game and sent the Falcons to the semifinals.

After arriving in Rochester, the Air Force offense kept up its shot total while Christopoulos remained stout in goal. The Falcons dispatched Canisius to reach their second consecutive title game and found a surprise waiting for them; the 7th-seed, Robert Morris had overcome long odds to reach the final and were riding high after taking down top-seeded Mercyhurst. Air Force put the Colonials in their place at the start, scoring twice in the first three minutes and ending the first period up 3–0. Robert Morris made a valiant effort to try and come back in the final 40 minutes, but Christopoulos was far too strong in net and the Falcons won the match by a comfortable 5–1 margin, earning the program's 7th Atlantic Hockey championship and a trip back to the NCAA tournament.

NCAA tournament
Though the team had been good over the preceding two and a half months, it was no surprise when Air Force was given the lowest seed for the tournament. That entitled the Falcons to a date with #1 St. Cloud State. The game started slowly but the Air Force needed to kill of two penalties in the later half of the first period to keep the Huskies from getting a lead. Early in the second, Ledford scored twice in the span of just over 3:30 to give the Falcons a surprising 2–0 lead. Afterwards, St. Cloud woke up and began attacking the Air Force goal. Christopoulos turned aside 18 shots in the middle frame to keep the Huskies from scoring. The upperclassmen continued to stymie St. Cloud State in the third but finally allowed the puck to get past him with just under 3 minutes left in regulation. The Huskies pulled their goalie in a desperate attempt to tie the game, but Air Force managed to collect two empty-net goals to win the match 4–1.

One win away from its first Frozen Four, the team was completely outplayed in the first period against Minnesota–Duluth. Air Force was outshot 0–14 and allowed two goals. The Bulldogs pulled back and played a defensive game in the final 40 minutes but that gave the Falcons a chance to tie the match. Though they only managed 12 shots in that time, Evan Giesler scored a power play goal in the middle part of the third period to cut the lead in half and the Falcons desperately tried to score the tying goal. Unfortunately, it wasn't to be and the Falcons were knocked out in the quarterfinal round.

Departures

Recruiting

Roster

Standings

Schedule and results

|-
!colspan=12 style=";" | Exhibition

|-
!colspan=12 style=";" | Regular Season

|-
!colspan=12 style=";" | 

|- align="center" bgcolor="#e0e0e0"
|colspan=12|Air Force Won Series 2–1

|-
!colspan=12 style=";" |

Scoring statistics

Goaltending statistics

Rankings

USCHO did not release a poll in Week 24.

Awards and honors

References

Air Force Falcons men's ice hockey seasons
Air Force Falcons
Air Force Falcons
Air Force Falcons
Air Force Falcons